Jorge Rivera Galindo (born October 28, 1978 in Puerto Tejada, Cauca, Colombia) is a Colombian footballer currently playing for León de Huánuco of the Primera División in Peru.

Teams
  Real Cartagena 1999
  Alcides Vigo 2000–2002
  Estudiantes de Medicina 2003
  Unión Huaral 2004–2006
  Alianza Atlético 2007–2008
  O'Higgins 2009
  Juan Aurich 2010
  Sport Huancayo 2011
  Alianza Lima 2012
  León de Huánuco 2013–present

Titles
  Real Cartagena 1999 (Primera B Colombian)
  Alcides Vigo 2001 (Segunda División Peruana)

References
 Profile at BDFA 

1978 births
Living people
Colombian footballers
Colombian expatriate footballers
Club Alianza Lima footballers
Peruvian Primera División players
Peruvian Segunda División players
Categoría Primera B players
Alianza Atlético footballers
Juan Aurich footballers
Unión Huaral footballers
Sport Huancayo footballers
León de Huánuco footballers
Club Alcides Vigo footballers
Estudiantes de Medicina footballers
Real Cartagena footballers
O'Higgins F.C. footballers
Expatriate footballers in Chile
Expatriate footballers in Peru
Association football goalkeepers
Colombian expatriate sportspeople in Chile
Colombian expatriate sportspeople in Peru